Cod liver oil is a dietary supplement derived from liver of cod fish (Gadidae). As with most fish oils, it contains the omega-3 fatty acids eicosapentaenoic acid (EPA) and docosahexaenoic acid (DHA), and also vitamin A and vitamin D. Historically, it was given to children because vitamin D had been shown to prevent rickets, a consequence of vitamin D deficiency.

Manufacture

Cod liver oil has traditionally come in many grades. Cod liver oil for human consumption is pale and straw colored, with a mild flavor. Scandinavian Vikings produced cod liver oil by laying birch tree branches over a kettle of water, and fresh livers were laid over the branches. The water was brought to a boil and as the steam rose, the oil from the liver dripped into the water and was skimmed off. There was also a method for producing fresh raw cod liver oil.
 
In the Industrial Revolution, cod liver oil became popular for industrial purposes. Livers placed in barrels to rot, with the oil skimmed off over the season, was the main method for producing this oil. The resulting oil was brown and foul tasting. In the 1800s cod liver oil became popular as a medicine and both pale and brown oils were used. Brown oils were common because they were cheaper to produce. Some doctors believed in only using the fresh pale oil, while others believed the brown oil was better. The rancid brown oils tended to cause intestinal upset.

The Möller Process was invented by Peter Möller in 1850. The livers are ground with water into a slurry, then this is gently simmered until the oil rises to the top. The oil is skimmed off and purified. Other methods used in modern times include the Cold Flotation Process, pressure extraction, and pressure cooking. These all require further purification steps to get a pure oil.

Therapeutic uses

Though similar in fatty acid composition to other fish oils, cod liver oil has higher concentrations of vitamins A and D. According to the United States Department of Agriculture, a tablespoon (13.6 grams or 14.8 mL) of cod liver oil contains 4,080 μg of retinol (vitamin A) and 34 μg (1360 IU) of vitamin D. The Dietary Reference Intake of vitamin A is 900 μg per day for adult men and 700 μg per day for women, while that for vitamin D is 15 μg per day. The Tolerable upper intake levels (ULs) are 3000 μg/day and 100 μg/day, respectively. People consuming cod liver oil as a source of omega-3 fatty acids should pay attention to how much vitamin A and vitamin D this adds to their diet.

Cod liver oil is approximately 20% omega-3 fatty acids. For this reason cod liver oil may be beneficial in secondary prophylaxis after a heart attack. Diets supplemented with cod liver oil have also been demonstrated to have beneficial effects on psoriasis and depression.

Potential adverse effects

A tablespoon (13.6 g) of cod liver oil contains 136% of the UL for preformed vitamin A (retinol). Vitamin A accumulates in the liver, and can reach harmful levels sufficient to cause hypervitaminosis A. Pregnant women may want to consider consulting a doctor when taking cod liver oil because of the high amount of retinol.

Fatty acid oxidation and environmental toxins content are reduced when purification processes are applied to produce refined fish oil products.

Other uses
In Newfoundland, cod liver oil was sometimes used as the liquid base for traditional red ochre paint, the coating of choice for use on outbuildings and work buildings associated with the cod fishery.

In Tübingen, Germany, drinking a glass of cod liver oil is the punishment for the loser at the traditional Stocherkahnrennen, a punting boat race by University of Tübingen groups.

See also

 Dan Dale Alexander
 Shark liver oil

References

External links 

Animal fats
Dietary supplements
Fish products